The Embassy of Tajikistan in Washington, D.C. is the Republic of Tajikistan's diplomatic mission to the United States. It is located at 1005 New Hampshire Avenue, Northwest, Washington, D.C., in the West End neighborhood. 

The Ambassador is Hamralizoda Farrukh .

Building
The building was constructed in 1889, as a private residence. Past occupants of the home include U.S. Congressman John Dalzell. During the 1960s, it served as the American Counseling Association headquarters. From 1981–1991, the building housed Robert Brown Contemporary Art, an art gallery now located at 2030 R Street, NW in Dupont Circle.

The Embassy of Tajikistan is 1 of 22 buildings in Schneider Triangle, a collection of Richardsonian Romanesque and Queen Anne Style residences designed by Thomas Franklin Schneider that are listed on the National Register of Historic Places.

References

External links

Tajikistan
Washington, D.C.
Historic district contributing properties in Washington, D.C.
Tajikistan–United States relations